Lynn Douglas Hoyem (June 27, 1939 – February 17, 1973) was an American football offensive lineman in the National Football League (NFL) for the Dallas Cowboys and Philadelphia Eagles. He played college football at Long Beach State University. He was drafted in the 19th round of the 1961 NFL Draft and in the 29th round of the 1962 AFL Draft.

Early years
Hoyem attended Redondo Union High School, where he played as a quarterback. He accepted a football scholarship from Long Beach State University. He was switched to center and became a three-year starter. He also played at linebacker.

In 1987, he was inducted into the Long Beach State Hall of Fame. The athletics department created the Lynn Hoyem Leadership Award in his honor.

Professional career

Dallas Cowboys
Hoyem was selected by the Dallas Cowboys in the 19th round (254th overall) of the 1961 NFL Draft with a future draft pick, which allowed the team to draft him before his college eligibility was over; becoming the first player from his school to be drafted into the NFL. He was also selected by the Denver Broncos in the 29th round (226th overall) of the 1962 AFL Draft.

On November 25, 1961, he signed with the Cowboys. He was a backup center and guard, that played mainly on special teams. In 1963 he started six games at left guard.

On March 20, 1964, he was traded to the Philadelphia Eagles along with Sam Baker and defensive tackle John Meyers, in exchange for wide receiver Tommy McDonald.

Philadelphia Eagles
In 1964, he started eight games at right guard after passing Pete Case  on the depth chart. Hoyem played for four seasons with the Philadelphia Eagles mostly in a reserve role on the offensive line. He announced his retirement on July 24, 1968.

Personal life
After his football career, he became a pilot for Northwest Airlines. On February 17, 1973, he died in a private plane crash.

References

External links
Long Beach Hall of Fame bio

1939 births
1973 deaths
Sportspeople from Redondo Beach, California
Players of American football from California
American football offensive guards
Long Beach State 49ers football players
Dallas Cowboys players
Philadelphia Eagles players
Aviators from California
Aviators killed in aviation accidents or incidents in the United States
Victims of aviation accidents or incidents in 1973